Tilray Brands, Inc. is an American pharmaceutical, cannabis-lifestyle and consumer packaged goods company, incorporated in the United States, headquartered in New York City. Tilray also has operations in Canada, Australia, New Zealand, and Latin America, with growing facilities in Germany and Portugal. 

In December 2020, the company announced a merger with Aphria, and will operate under the Tilray name and its ticker symbol on NASDAQ and the Toronto Stock Exchange.

History 
Founded in 2014, Tilray was originally incorporated under the umbrella of Seattle-based Privateer Holdings and was one of Canada’s first licensed producers.  At the end of 2014, it secured the first institutional investment in the cannabis industry from Founders Fund, a San Francisco-based venture capital fund. In 2016, it became the first cannabis company to conduct a clinical trial approved by Health Canada. The trial evaluated the therapeutic potential of medical cannabis. In January 2017, Tilray was certified for good manufacturing practices.

By October 2018, the company had raised $1.1 billion. In July 2018, it became the first cannabis company to trade publicly on a major U.S. stock exchange, opening on the NASDAQ exchange at a price of $17 per share, which increased in September 2018 to $214 per share, and then descended to $29 per share by August 2019. The IPO raised  million.

In September 2018, Tilray became the first Canadian cannabis company to legally export medical cannabis to the U.S. for a clinical trial. In December 2018, the company signed a deal with Novartis subsidiary Sandoz to sell, distribute and co-brand Tilray's non-smokeable/non-combustible medical cannabis products in legal markets worldwide. On June 19, 2018, Tilray announced the launch of High Park Company which operates in the adult recreational cannabis market to establish unique adult-use brands in Canada.

Since September 2022, Tilray has been licensed by the Polish and Italian Ministries of Health to import and distribute THC25 medical cannabis throughout Poland and Italy.

Strategic partnerships and acquisitions 
In 2018, Tilray announced it had entered into global alliance with Sandoz, a division of Novartis to co-brand and distribute non-combustible medical cannabis products in global markets where it is legally authorized. The Globe and Mail dubbed this partnership as ‘big-pharma’s first foray into cannabis’. 

Also in 2018, Tilray announced a $100-million joint venture with the world's largest brewer, AbInBev to research non-alcohol tetrahydrocannabinol (THC) and cannabidiol (CBD)-infused beverages, through their respective subsidiaries, Labatt Breweries and High Park Company.

In 2019, Tilray signed a $250 million revenue-sharing deal with U.S. based brand company, Authentic Brands Group, to leverage ABG brand names, such as Juicy Couture, Greg Norman, and Nine West to create cannabis products. ABG has a portfolio of over 50 brands.

In February 2019, Tilray acquired Manitoba Harvest, a hemp foods manufacturer, for $317 million from Compass Diversified Holdings. The acquisition allowed Tilray to use Manitoba Harvest's retail distribution network to enter the U.S. CBD market. Manitoba Harvest's products are available in approximately 13,000 U.S. stores and 3,600 in Canada.

Also in 2019, Tilray entered into an agreement with Natura Naturals Holdings which owns 155,000 square feet of licensed cultivation greenhouses in Leamington, Ontario. The acquisition doubled the cultivation ability of the company in Canada. In May 2020, Tilray announced closure of the High Park Gardens site (previously Natura Naturals) for cost reductions.

In July 2019, Tilray acquired U.K.-based Smith & Sinclair to develop CBD-infused edibles. In August 2019, Tilray acquired Alberta cannabis retailer, Four20.

Merger with Aphria
On 15 December 2020, Aphria conducted a reverse acquisition of Tilray, creating the largest global cannabis company by revenue and geographic reach. The chief executive officer (CEO) of Aphria, Irwin D. Simon, stated that the merger strategy was to capture Tilray's business assets and public trading exposure in the United States and its free trade abilities in Europe, enabling potential for becoming a global operation. Irwin was named as CEO and chairman of the board for the merged company, and Tilray CEO, Brendan Kennedy, will be a member of the board of directors. The merged companies will keep Tilray's name and trade under the Tilray ticker symbol, TLRY, on the NASDAQ exchange. 

By combining assets, the new Tilray company will develop craft beer and cannabis-infused beverages in partnership with Anheuser-Busch InBev, and have branded hemp and cannabidiol products. According to one source, the world market potential for cannabis products is $94 billion by 2025.

Preliminary clinical research 
In partnership with University of Sydney, NSW Government, Chris O'Brien Lifehouse, Tilray participated in a clinical trial testing the efficacy and tolerability of medical cannabis as a possible treatment for the side effects of chemotherapy. Led by The Hospital for Sick Children, in Toronto, Canada, Tilray provided a cannabidiol (CBD) oil product available in Canada to test the efficacy and tolerability of medical cannabis oil as a possible treatment for pediatric epilepsy (Dravet syndrome). In partnership with the University of British Columbia, Tilray provided medical cannabis products used to test medical cannabis as a possible treatment for post-traumatic stress disorder. In partnership with the Grupo Español de Investigación en Neurooncología GEINO, in Spain, Tilray supplied medical cannabis products for the trial testing the efficacy and tolerability of medical cannabis as a possible treatment for glioblastoma. 

In 2019, Tilray signed an agreement with Cannamedical Pharma GmbH to export $3.3 million worth of medical cannabis from its Portugal facility to Germany, marking Tilray's first export from Tilray Portugal Unipessoal, Lda. Tilray also has a research partnership with Coimbra University in Portugal.  

In August 2019, Tilray announced a partnership with New York University to study the potential ability of CBD to treat alcohol use disorder and post-traumatic stress disorder. In partnership with New York University, Tilray supplied CBD for a clinical trial studying its possible efficacy for treating disorders caused by breast cancer treatments.

References

External links 
 

2018 initial public offerings
Canadian companies established in 2013
Cannabis companies of Canada
Companies listed on the Nasdaq
Companies listed on the Toronto Stock Exchange
Pharmaceutical industry
Pharmaceutical companies of Canada
Pharmaceutical companies established in 2013